Nandy or Nandi is an Indian surname (meaning pleasing, from Sanskrit ānand) which is particularly found in West Bengal and Odisha. Notable people with the surname include:

 Abhilasha Gupta Nandi, Indian politician
 Amitava Nandy (born 1943), Indian politician
 Anshuman Nandi, Indian child actor
 Arnab Nandi (born 1987), Indian cricketer
 Ashis Nandy (born 1937), Indian academic
 Basabi Nandi (1935–2018), Indian actress and singer
 Bibhuti Bhusan Nandy (1940–2008), Indian intelligence official
 Bishweshwar Nandi, Indian gymnast
 Dipak Nandy (born 1936), Indian academic and politician in the UK
 Dibyendu Nandi, Indian space scientist
 Jyotirindranath Nandi (1912–1982), Indian writer
 Jyotirindra Nath Nandi metro station, Kolkata, India
 Krishna Kanta Nandi, Indian trader during British colonial rule
 Kushan Nandy (born 1972), Indian film producer
 Lisa Nandy (born 1979), British politician
 Manindra Chandra Nandy (1860–1929), Maharaja of Cossimbazar Raj
 Moti Nandi (1931–2010), Indian writer and journalist
 Narasimha Nandi, Indian filmmaker and writer in Telugu cinema
 Palash Nandy (born 1952), Indian cricketer, played for Bengal, later a coach
 Pranob Nandy (born 1955), Indian cricketer, played for Bengal
 Pritish Nandy (born 1951), Indian writer and politician
 Rasikendra Nath Nandi, Indian social reformer
 Nand Kumar Nandi, Indian politician
 Samit Kumar Nandi (born 1967), Indian veterinarian
 Sampath Nandi (born 1980), Indian filmmaker in Telugu cinema
 Sandhyakar Nandi (c. 1084 - 1155), Indian Sanskrit poet in the Pala Empire, writer of Ramacharitam
 Sandip Nandy, Indian footballer
 Sanhita Nandi, Indian classical vocalist of Hindustani music
 Sukumar Nandi, Indian electrical engineer
 Sunil Nandy (born 1935), Indian cricketer, played for Bengal
 Vyoma Nandi, Indian actress

Indian surnames
Surnames of Indian origin
Hindu surnames
Bengali-language surnames
Telugu-language surnames